Phataria unifascialis is a species of starfish in the family Ophidiasteridae. It is sometimes known as the  blue seastar or tan starfish, but both these names are also used for other species (e.g., blue seastar for Linckia laevigata). It is native to the eastern Pacific Ocean where it ranges from the Gulf of California and Magdalena Bay (Mexico) to northwest Peru, including various eastern Pacific island groups such as the Galápagos.

Distribution in Panama

In Panama this species has been collected from Monte Island (USNM E 11842), Pearl Islands Archipelago (USNM E 7595) and Taboga Island (USNM 39144), Taboguilla Island (USNM E 11832, depth 12 m), Culebra Island (USNM E 37379, USNM E 37377; Centroid Latitude: 8.9133, Centroid Longitude: -79.5317), Venado Island (USNM E 37376; Centroid Latitude: 8.8792, Centroid Longitude: -79.59583), Perico Island (USNM E 35150), Gulf of Panama, eastern Pacific.

References

External links
 

Ophidiasteridae
Animals described in 1840